The Sea Around Us is a 1953 American documentary film written and produced by Irwin Allen, based on the book of the same name by Rachel L. Carson. It won the Academy Award for Best Documentary Feature.

Cast
 Don Forbes as Narrator
 Theodore von Eltz as Narrator

References

External links

The Sea Around Us on YouTube

1953 films
1953 documentary films
American documentary films
1950s English-language films
Best Documentary Feature Academy Award winners
Documentary films about nature
Films directed by Irwin Allen
Films produced by Irwin Allen
Films scored by Paul Sawtell
RKO Pictures films
Rachel Carson
1950s American films